Karukerina is a genus of medium-sized sea slugs, marine opisthobranch gastropod mollusks.  They are headshield slugs, in the family Runcinidae

Species
 Karukerina antola Ortea, 2013

References

 Ortea, J.; Espinosa, J.; Buske, Y.; Caballer, M. (2013). Additions to the inventory of the sea slugs (Opisthobranchia and Sacoglossa) from Guadeloupe (Lesser Antilles, Caribbean Sea). Revista de la Academia Canaria de Ciencias. 25: 163-194.